Iberomorda viridipennis is a species of beetle in the genus Iberomorda of the family Mordellidae, which is part of the superfamily Tenebrionoidea. It was described in 1856 by Francisco.

References

Beetles described in 1856
Mordellidae